Göreme Historical National Park is a national park in central Turkey. It occupies an area of nearly 100 km2 (39 sq mi) and is located in Nevşehir Province. It became a UNESCO World Heritage Site in 1985 under the name Goreme National Park and the Rock Sites of Cappadocia. The park features a rocky, water- and wind-eroded landscape with a network of ancient, interconnecting underground settlements.

Description

The National Park is located in the volcanic region of Mount Hasan and Mount Erciyes in Central Anatolia, in the vicinity of Ürgüp, Çavuşin and Göreme. The park area consists of plateaus and high hills, dissected by streams and river valleys carved out by the water, the valleys having steeply sloping sides. Part of this rugged area consists of basalt and thick beds of tuff. The tuff is the result of ash emitted from volcanoes millions of years ago, which solidified into soft rock, and has since been overlain by solidified lava which forms a protective capping. This has been eroded over the millennia to form the multi-coloured cliffs, rock towers, pillars, tent rocks and fairy chimney rock formations present in the park. Love Valley is known for its fairy chimneys.

The earliest signs of monastic activity in Cappadocia can be traced back to the 4th century when small anchorite communities, following the teachings of Basileios the Great, Bishop of Kayseri, started to inhabit the cells hewn in the rock. Later, the communities took refuge together in underground villages to avoid attacks by marauding Arabs.

Underground dwellings
People have made use of the soft tuff rock to hollow out underground dwellings. The earliest monastic activity in Cappadocia is thought to have been in the fourth century when anchorites started hewing out cells from the rock. To resist Arab marauders, they linked these cells and created underground communities, with chapels, store rooms, and living quarters. Villages and small towns were developed in this way, and by 842, underground churches were being richly decorated with coloured paintings.

Nowadays people don't live far underground as in the past when they were hiding or fleeing enemies. But some people still live in cave dwellings that have been made into homes, with a door/opening to daylight at ground level. Unfortunately, it has been found that long-term cave dwellers experience an unexpectedly high incidence of mesothelioma, a form of cancer. This has been linked to the inhalation of erionite fibres, a mineral common in tuff formations.

References

National parks of Turkey
World Heritage Sites in Turkey
Cultural history of Turkey
Landforms of Nevşehir Province
Tourist attractions in Nevşehir Province
Former national parks